Nasalis may refer to:

 Proboscis monkey (Nasalis larvatus), the only monkey in the genus Nasalis
 Nasalis muscle